Templeton Thompson is a country music singer-songwriter. Her songs have been recorded by performers such as Reba McEntire, Jo Dee Messina, Little Texas, and Sherrié Austin.

Early life and education
She was raised on  near Glen Rose, Texas, owned by her parents. Thompson has been fond of both horses and music since she was young. She said that her mother rode horses while pregnant and thus "I came into this world horse crazy." At age 16, she nearly lost two fingers on her left hand while trying to hitch a horse. She underwent eight surgeries and has "very limited mobility" on that hand, but taught herself to use a left-handed guitar.

She later moved east, living in Virginia and Maryland before attending college at the University of Virginia, where she majored in English. Originally, she intended to go to law school, but in 1992, following graduation, she moved to Nashville to pursue a music career.

Career
Thompson began to write music for pay in 1995, following an internship at Arista Records. When singer Reba McEntire recorded one of her songs, Thompson sang as a backup singer on the recording.  Her two interests have come together in some of her albums, such as Girls and Horses, and songs, including "When I Get This Pony Rode". She also has had a song, "Settle Down, Cinderella", included on the soundtrack of the DVD Dr. Dolittle 3 and, in collaboration with Gay, provided the music for the DVD 7 Clinics with Buck Brannaman, a spinoff from the documentary Buck, directed by Cindy Meehl. In the course of creating the soundtrack for 7 Clinics, she also was able to collaborate with Meehl to create a professional music video for "When I Get This Pony Rode" that aired on Country Music Television, where it reached #1, and on Great American Country, where it remained in the top 10 for eight weeks.

In 2014, she recorded a song she co-wrote with Gay, "Bring it on Home, Chrome," in honor of the race horse California Chrome, with a portion of the profits going to the Thoroughbred retirement facility Old Friends Equine.

Personal life
Thompson describes herself as a "hippie chic cowgirl".  She lists as her musical influences artists such as Emmylou Harris, Bonnie Raitt, Don Williams, and rock musician Sheryl Crow. In addition to writing and performing her own music, she sings as a session musician. She has a YouTube channel called "Life on Planet Cowgirl", and is certified to do Equine-assisted therapy. A horse owner, her horse "Jane" was immortalized as a Breyer Model Horse.

She is married to fellow musician Sam Gay, with whom she collaborates on some of her music.

Discography 
 I Remember You (2003)
 I Still Feel (2004)
 Girls & Horses (2006)
 Life On Planet Cowgirl (2009)
 That's Just Me (2011)
Compilation Albums
 Icy Blue Heart (2012)
 Songs From 7 Clinics (2012)

References

American country singer-songwriters
American country guitarists
American women guitarists
Living people
University of Virginia alumni
People from Glen Rose, Texas
Country musicians from Texas
Year of birth missing (living people)
21st-century American women
Singer-songwriters from Texas